Henry Atkinson may refer to:

 Henry Atkinson (priest), Anglican priest in Australia
 Henry Atkinson (scientist) (1781–1824), British mathematician and astronomer
 Henry Atkinson (soldier) (1782–1842), U.S. army officer during the Black Hawk War
 Henry Dresser Atkinson (1841–1921), 19th-century Australian naturalist and clergyman
 Henry Farmer-Atkinson (1828–1913), born Henry John Atkinson, English politician
 Henry Wallace Atkinson (1866–1938), architect in Brisbane, Queensland, Australia

See also
 Henry Atkinson manuscript, an early (1694-5) music manuscript in Northumberland
 Harry Atkinson (disambiguation)